Claude Kahn (born 9 November 1935) is a French classical pianist. Internationally renowned concert performer, known for his interpretations of Romantic music and more precisely the music of Chopin, but also of French music (Debussy, Fauré, Ravel) as soloist or accompanied by great orchestras in the world.

Biography 
Born in Marseille, Kahn started playing the piano at the age of four, then for over 10 years was a student of Marguerite Long. His other teachers were Yves Nat and Nadia Boulanger. In 1956, he received the prize for best interpretation for La Campanella unanimously by the jury at the Franz Liszt Competition in Budapest, when he was only 15, as well as the Grand Prix Casella in Naples, the Grand Prix de l'École Française de Musique, the Medal of the Competition in Geneva.

He has released over twenty albums dedicated to Chopin, his favourite composer, but also Bach, Mozart, Beethoven, Schubert, Liszt, Schumann, Brahms, Tchaikovsky, Rachmaninoff, Fauré, Ravel, Debussy, and others...

In 1970, he created the "Claude Kahn International Piano Competition" which became "International" in 1980 and European in 1990. The finals and the concert of the winners traditionally take place Salle Gaveau in Paris. Among the winners are Bernard d'Ascoli, Laure Favre-Kahn, Jean-Frédéric Neuburger, Delphine Bardin, François Weigel, and Alexandre Tharaud.

Selected discography 
 Ravel's Piano Concerto and Piano Concerto for the Left Hand
 Brahms's Intermezzi - Ballade - 2nd Rhapsodie - Sonata Opus 5, Epidaure 10055 
 Chopin's 18 Valses pour piano, Epidaure, 2004
 Chopin's 24 Études pour piano, Epidaure, 2004
 Chopin's 4e Ballade, Mazurkas, Polonaise Fantaisie..., Epidaure, 2006
 Debussy's 24 Préludes, Epidaure 2005
 Schumann's Papillons - Fantaisie Opus 17 - Etudes symphoniques, Epidaure, 2009
 Debussy-Liszt: 12 Études (Debussy) - Après une lecture de Dante, Funérailles (Liszt)
 Schubert-Liszt: Sonate in B flat major and sonata in B minor, Epidaure 2006
 Récital Chopin-Schumann: 1st and 3rd Scherzo, Polonaise Héroïque, Sonata Op. 58.

References

External links 
 Official website
 Discography (Discogs)
 Claude KAHN - Polonaise Héroïque (Chopin) (YouTube)

20th-century French male classical pianists
Musicians from Marseille
Living people
21st-century French male classical pianists
1935 births